Seizures in Barren Praise is the second full-length album by extreme metal band, Trap Them. It was released on November 11, 2008. It continues the days in a now non-linear fashion (starting from Day Nineteen, after Day Eighteen: Enders from the Trap Them/Extreme Noise Terror split) in the fictional area of Barren Praise.

Track listing

Personnel
Kurt Ballou – bass, guitar, noise, producer, engineer
Brian Vincent Izzi – guitar
Ryan McKenney – vocals, Lyricist
Stephen LaCour – bass
Mike Justian – drums
Nick Zampiello – mastering

References

2008 albums
Albums produced by Kurt Ballou
Deathwish Inc. albums
Trap Them albums
Albums with cover art by Jacob Bannon